The Savane River is a tributary of the east bank of the rivière des Neiges, flowing in the unorganized territory of Lac-Jacques-Cartier, in the La Côte-de-Beaupré Regional County Municipality, in the administrative region of Capitale-Nationale, in the province of Quebec, in Canada.

The upper part of this river begins south of Lac Allioux in the Laurentides Wildlife Reserve; then the course of the river flows outside and more or less parallel to the limit of the reserve. The upper part of this river flows more or less in parallel with the Portage brook flowing north crossing Lac Savane then borrowing the course of the rivière Savane du Nord which is a tributary of the Sainte-Anne River.

This valley is mainly served by a secondary forest road going up the south-eastern bank of the Savane river. This route is mainly used for forestry and recreational tourism activities.

Because of its altitude, the surface of the upper Savane River is generally frozen from the beginning of December until the end of March; however, safe traffic on the ice is generally from mid-December to mid-March. The water level of the river varies with the seasons and the precipitation; the spring flood occurs in March or April.

Geography 

  south-west bypassing a mountain whose summit reaches , then branching south-west through a marsh area at the end of the segment, to a stream (coming from the west);
  towards the south-east by first crossing an area of marsh, to a stream (coming from the east);
  towards the south by first forming a hook towards the east, then by forming a loop towards the east, collecting a stream (coming from the northwest) and another ( from the east), to a small dam built at the mouth of a small lake;
  to the south passing between two mountains and collecting two streams (coming from the east), up to the outlet of Lac à l'Île (coming from the east);
  to the south in an increasingly deep valley, collecting the O'Grady stream (coming from the northwest) and gathering a mountain stream (coming from the east), up to a bend corresponding to a Sauvage stream (coming from the east);
  to the west in a deep valley, to its mouth.

From the confluence of the Camp Brûlé river, the current descends on  southwards the course of the Rivière des Neiges, then flows on  generally towards the south by the course of the Montmorency river, to the northwest shore of the Saint-Laurent river.

Toponymy 
The river toponym of Camp Brûlé was formalized on December 13, 1996, at the Commission de toponymie du Québec.

See also 

 La Côte-de-Beaupré Regional County Municipality
 Lac-Jacques-Cartier, an unorganized territory
 Montmorency River
 Rivière des Neiges
 List of rivers of Quebec

Notes and references

Sources 
 

Rivers of Capitale-Nationale
La Côte-de-Beaupré Regional County Municipality
Laurentides Wildlife Reserve